Crivitz station is a railway station in the municipality of Crivitz, located in the Ludwigslust-Parchim district in Mecklenburg-Vorpommern, Germany.

References

Railway stations in Mecklenburg-Western Pomerania
Buildings and structures in Ludwigslust-Parchim
Railway stations opened in 1888